Ozark Township is a township in Texas County, in the U.S. state of Missouri.

Ozark Township was erected in 1860, taking its name from the Ozarks range.

References

Townships in Missouri
Townships in Texas County, Missouri